Constantin Niculescu (born 26 May 1944) is a Romanian boxer. He competed in the men's welterweight event at the 1964 Summer Olympics. At the 1964 Summer Olympics, he defeated Alfonso Ramírez of Mexico, before losing to Ernest Mabwa of Uganda.

References

External links
 

1944 births
Living people
Romanian male boxers
Olympic boxers of Romania
Boxers at the 1964 Summer Olympics
People from Urziceni
Welterweight boxers